Mary Allison may refer to:

 Mary Bruins Allison (1903–1994), American missionary physician in Arabia
 Mary Emma Allison (1917–2010), American school librarian